Sharon, Lois & Bram Sampler is a mini-album/compilation by Sharon, Lois & Bram, originally released in 1995 under the American Drive Entertainment Inc. label. It is available only on cassette and is extremely hard to find.  It was released to promote the release of their 1995, one-and-only CD-ROM game, CyberBoogie!.

Packaging
The cassette features a rare version of the trio's Sing Around the Campfire album photo shoot. Inside, the cassette features a foldout "album collage". It has pictures of various albums previously released by the trio. It also gives a small amount of information about the songs that are found on the album.

Track listing

"One Elephant Went Out to Play"
"The Name Game"
"Don't Bring An Elephant (To A Family Meal)"
"Skinnamarink"
"Everybody Happy"
"Jump Josie / Skip to My Loo"
"Candles Long Ago"
"Tingalayo"

Songs 1 & 8 from One Elephant, Deux Éléphants
Song 2 from Sing A to Z
Song 3 from Candles, Snow & Mistletoe
Song 4 from Sharon, Lois & Bram's Elephant Show Record
Song 5 from All the Fun You Can Sing!
Song 6 from Mainly Mother Goose
Song 7 from Candles Long Ago

References

Sharon, Lois & Bram albums
1995 compilation albums